Baudhimai (Nepali: बौधीमाई ) is a municipality in Rautahat District, a part of Province No. 2 in Nepal. It was formed in 2016 occupying current 9 sections (wards) from previous 9 former VDCs. It occupies an area of 35.34 km2 with a total population of 36,268.

References 

Local Language in Baudhimai municipality is Bojpuri, Baajika and Hindi as well.
Local Language in Baudhimai municipality is Bojpuri, Baajika and Hindi as well.

Populated places in Rautahat District
Nepal municipalities established in 2017
Municipalities in Madhesh Province